Mukhtar Ahmed may refer to:

 Mukhtar Ahmed (cricketer), Pakistani cricketer for Sialkot
 Mukhtar Ahmed (editor), Bollywood film editor and actor, winner of the 1994 Screen Award for Best Editing
 Mukhtar Ahmed Ansari (1880–1936), Indian politician
 Mukhtar Ahmad Dogar, Pakistani pilot
 Mukhtiar Ahmad Junejo (born 1940), Pakistani judge